Henry Martin Pope (1843-1908) was an English painter, engraver and art teacher, known primarily for landscapes, which he painted in oil or watercolour.

Pope was born in 1843 in Birmingham, England. He trained as a lithographer and was taught painting by Samuel Lines. He was a founder, with Walter Langley and others, of the Birmingham Art Circle and taught art in the city. He served for eleven years as president of the Clarendon Art Fellowship. He visited Newlyn with Langley from 1880. 

His works are in the collections of Birmingham Museums Trust, the Herbert Art Gallery and Museum, y Gaer and Dudley Museums. He exhibited with the Birmingham Art Circle and at the Royal Birmingham Society of Artists.

He died on 8 February 1908.

Notes

References

Further reading 

 

 1843 births
 1908 deaths
19th-century painters
20th-century painters
English male painters
People from Birmingham, West Midlands
Art educators
English watercolourists